Holbeach Hurn is a small fenland village in the civil parish of Holbeach in the South Holland district of southern Lincolnshire, England.

 
Holbeach Hurn appears as the one word 'Holbechehern' in a legal record of 1433.
In 1885 Kelly’s noted the village as an ecclesiastical parish formed from that of Holbeach in 1870, and the presence of both a Wesleyan and  Primitive Methodist chapel.

The village church, dedicated to St Luke, was built between 1869 and 1871. It is constructed of red brick in Early English style and consists of chancel, nave and south porch, and an alabaster reredos with evangelistic symbols. In 1964 Pevsner reported a bellcote and lancet windows, and within the church a large early 19th-century painting of the Adoration of the Shepherds, "no doubt the altarpiece of an important church".

References

External links
 
 Holbeach, Genuki. Retrieved 26 October 2011
Holbeach Hurn: Village Hall, Holbeachhurn.org.uk. Retrieved 26 October 2011

Villages in Lincolnshire
Holbeach